Böckler is a German surname. Notable people with this surname include:

 Annette M. Böckler (born 1966), librarian at the Leo Baeck College London, writer and translator on Jewish subjects
 Georg Andreas Böckler (1644–1698), German architect and engineer specialising in hydraulic architecture
 Hans Böckler (1875–1951), German politician and union leader
 Otto Böckler (1867–1932), German writer and politician

See also
 Böcker (disambiguation)

German-language surnames